SS Kingston Hill was a cargo ship built by William Hamilton & Co in Port Glasgow on the Firth of Clyde. She was completed in December 1940. She was managed by Counties Ship Management Co Ltd of London (CSM), an offshoot of the Rethymnis & Kulukundis shipbroking company.

Kingston Hill had a single 520 NHP triple-expansion steam engine driving a single screw.

On 22 February 1941 Luftwaffe aircraft bombed and damaged the ship. She was repaired at Glasgow.

Sinking
In May 1941 Kingston Hill sailed from Cardiff and Glasgow laden with coal and general cargo for Alexandria in Egypt. To avoid the enemy-controlled waters of the Mediterranean she was heading via Cape Town, South Africa, but was unescorted. She was southwest of the Cape Verde Islands heading into the South Atlantic when the  hit her with two torpedoes at 0108 hrs on 8 June 1941. She sank at 0125 hrs with the loss of her Master and 13 crew. 16 crew were rescued by the Royal Navy destroyer  and returned to Greenock. 26 crew were rescued by the US tanker Alabama and landed at Cape Town.

References

Sources & further reading

Ships built on the River Clyde
Steamships of the United Kingdom
1940 ships
Ships of Counties Ship Management
Maritime incidents in June 1941
Ships sunk by German submarines in World War II
World War II shipwrecks in the Atlantic Ocean
World War II merchant ships of the United Kingdom